K-Ville may refer to:

 Krzyzewskiville, a line of students wishing to gain access to basketball games at Duke University
 K-Ville (TV series), a 2007 television series on Fox
 Kville Hundred, Bohuslän, Sweden
 Kernersville, North Carolina